Aaron Brooking Dessner (born April 23, 1976) is an American musician, songwriter, and record producer. He is best known as a founding member of the rock band The National, with whom he has recorded eight studio albums; a co-founder of the indie rock duo Big Red Machine, teaming with Bon Iver's Justin Vernon; and a collaborator on Taylor Swift's studio albums Folklore and Evermore, both of which contended for the Grammy Award for Album of the Year in 2021 and 2022, respectively, with the former winning the accolade.

Dessner has co-written, produced or co-produced songs by Taylor Swift, Michael Stipe, Gracie Abrams, Frightened Rabbit, Ben Howard, Sharon Van Etten, Local Natives, This Is the Kit, Adia Victoria, Lisa Hannigan, and Lone Bellow, amongst others. Working alongside his twin brother Bryce, the pair curated and produced the charity compilations, Dark Was the Night (2009) and Day of the Dead (2016), for the Red Hot Organization. Dessner co-founded and curates three music festivals: Eaux Claires in Eau Claire, Wisconsin, alongside his Big Red Machine partner Vernon; HAVEN in Copenhagen with his brother Bryce, and Boston Calling Music Festival.

On May 19, 2022, alongside Questlove, Dessner was awarded a Doctor of Fine Arts honoris causa from The University of the Arts, for "his eagerness to seek out opportunities, to really be a thoughtful collaborator, and someone who would encourage every single student at UArts to explore with their peers across disciplines, new opportunities, and new ideas."

Early life 

Dessner was raised as Jewish and has Polish Jewish and Russian Jewish ancestry. Dessner has said that his Jewish background influences his music: "My brother and I have always been fascinated by liturgical religious melodies in Judaism ... I don't like major chords. I like the meditative patterns in certain prayers, and I like music that repeats itself." Dessner attended high school at Cincinnati Country Day School and graduated in 1994. Dessner went on to study Modern European History at Columbia University.

Career

The National 

Aaron Dessner and his twin brother Bryce were childhood friends with Bryan Devendorf. In 1998, after Dessner's earlier band, Project Nim, broke up, Devendorf invited the brothers to join his band the National. With Devendorf and the Dessner brothers were Scott Devendorf, Bryan's older brother, and Matt Berninger. The band's self-titled first album was released in 2001 on Brassland Records, a label Dessner co-founded along with his brother Bryce and Alec Hanley Bemis. The band's second album, Sad Songs for Dirty Lovers, was released in 2003, also on Brassland. After some critical success with Sad Songs, the band signed with Beggars Banquet Records. With the new label, they released their third studio album, Alligator, in 2005. The album received a positive response from critics, which exposed the band to a larger audience. In 2007, the band released their fourth album, Boxer, also through Beggars Banquet. Upon release, the album received widespread critical acclaim, and was named to "album of the year" lists. Several songs from the album appeared in TV shows and movies. In 2008, then-Senator Barack Obama used an instrumental version of the song "Fake Empire" in a presidential campaign video.

Following the success of Boxer, the band began collaborating with other artists on various songs and compilation albums. In 2009, the band participated in Dark Was the Night, a charity album to benefit the Red Hot Organization. That same year, they recorded a song for the album Ciao My Shining Star: The Songs of Mark Mulcahy, to help support Polaris frontman Mark Mulcahy who had recently lost his wife. In 2010, the band released High Violet, their fifth full-length album. The album saw both critical and commercial success, debuting at No. 3 on US charts, and going on to sell over 850,000 copies worldwide. The band followed up High Violet by releasing their sixth album, Trouble Will Find Me, on May 21, 2013, via 4AD. Like their previous two efforts, Trouble was named to several year-end best-of lists. The album was nominated for Best Alternative Album at the 56th Grammy Awards. Later that year, Dessner and the rest of the band were featured in the documentary Mistaken for Strangers, which followed the band's tour for High Violet and early recording of Trouble. In 2017, the band released Sleep Well Beast, their seventh full-length album. The lead single from the album, "The System Only Dreams in Total Darkness", became the band's first song to reach No. 1 on a Billboards chart after topping the Adult Alternative Songs list in August that same year.

Dessner has production credits on all of the band's albums since Alligator. The majority of both High Violet and Trouble Will Find Me were recorded in his garage studio behind his house in Brooklyn, and Alligator and Boxer were partially recorded in his attic and in his sister's attic, which is on the same street in Brooklyn. Most recently, he produced Sleep Well Beast and I Am Easy To Find in his upstate New York studio, Long Pond.

Big Red Machine

In 2008, Dessner sent Justin Vernon an instrumental sketch of a song called "Big Red Machine" for the compilation album Dark Was the Night. Vernon wrote a song to it, interpreting the Big Red Machine title as a heart. After 10 years, the pair formed a band called Big Red Machine, and on August 31, 2018, released a self-titled album. The record was produced by Vernon and Dessner with longtime collaborator Brad Cook and engineered by Jonathan Low primarily at Dessner's studio Long Pond in Upper Hudson Valley, New York.

The duo released a second studio album How Long Do You Think Its Gonna Last? on August 27, 2021. The album was produced by Dessner and featured many guests and many of his previous collaborators, including Ben Howard, Sharon Van Etten, and Taylor Swift.

Other production work 
Outside of his work with the National, Dessner has helped produce work for several other artists.

Dessner worked with singer Sharon Van Etten on her album, Tramp (2012). Van Etten and Dessner spent over fourteen months working in his studio, finally releasing the album to widespread critical success. Dessner produced Local Natives' second full-length album Hummingbird, in 2013. Dessner was first introduced to the band while on tour with the National. Hummingbird received positive reviews, and Pitchfork praised Dessner's production work especially, saying that he "knows how to make things sound good, and there's plenty of richness and depth to these songs." Dessner produced the Lone Bellow's Then Came the Morning, which was recorded in Dessner's garage as well as in a 19th-century church in upstate New York. The album was released in January 2015 on Descendent Records. That same year, he worked with This Is the Kit for their album Bashed Out, which was released through Dessner's Brassland Records.

In 2016, Dessner produced Lisa Hannigan's album At Swim. The album reached No. 1 in Ireland, No. 7 on the US Top Heatseekers Albums chart and No. 24 in the UK, and received widespread critical acclaim. The Guardian, which awarded it four out of five stars, commented on the album's "stunningly pretty songs with quietly powerful undertones" and the Evening Standard, which also awarded it four out of five stars, praised the "new-found accessibility" of the album. Frightened Rabbit's fifth album Painting of a Panic Attack, released in 2016 via Atlantic Records, was also produced by Dessner. Dessner produced the Lone Bellow's 2020 album Half Moon Light and co-wrote several tracks on it. He also co-wrote and produced the acclaimed debut of UK songwriter Eve Owen, Don't Let the Ink Dry, released in 2020.

In April 2020, during the COVID-19 pandemic, Dessner was approached by American singer-songwriter Taylor Swift to collaborate on music. Dessner subsequently produced and co-wrote her eighth studio album, Folklore. It was a surprise release that debuted to critical acclaim on July 24, 2020, and won Album of the Year at the 63rd Annual Grammy Awards in 2021. Dessner continued his collaboration with Swift on her ninth studio and second surprise album, Evermore, released later that year on December 11. Dessner's production involvement with Swift continued through her process of re-recording her back catalogue, beginning with Fearless (Taylor's Version), the 2021 re-recording of Swift's 2008 album, Fearless, Red (Taylor's Version), the 2021 re-recording of her 2012 album, Red and continuing in the 3am edition with her tenth studio album Midnights. After the release of Folklore, Folklore: The Long Pond Studio Sessions and Evermore, artists such as Maya Hawke, Gracie Abrams, Ed Sheeran, King Princess, and Girl in Red desired to collaborate with Dessner and record songs at his Long Pond Studio. Dessner stated, "After Taylor, it was a bit crazy how many people reached out. And getting to meet and write songs with people you wouldn't have had access to… I'm so grateful for it."

Dessner also co-produced British singer-songwriter Ben Howard's fourth studio album, Collections from the Whiteout, alongside Howard himself, which was released on March 26, 2021. Additionally, Dessner produced Day of the Dead, which was released in 2016, and Dark Was the Night, both of which are AIDS charity compilations for the Red Hot Organization; and Doveman's 2009 release The Conformist.

Film scores
Dessner and his brother Bryce co-composed the score for Transpecos, which won the Audience Award at the 2016 South by Southwest. They also worked together on the score for 2013 film Big Sur, an adaptation of the 1962 novel of the same name by Jack Kerouac. The film debuted on January 23, 2013, at the Sundance Film Festival, where it received positive reviews. In 2021, together with his brother, Dessner scored two films – Mike Mills' C'mon C'mon and Cyrano.

Collaborations

Day of the Dead
On March 17, 2016, Aaron and Bryce Dessner announced Day of the Dead, a charity tribute album to the Grateful Dead released by 4AD on May 20, 2016. Day of the Dead was created, curated and produced by both Dessner brothers. The compilation is a wide-ranging tribute to the songwriting and experimentalism of the Dead which took four years to record, features over 60 artists from varied musical backgrounds, 59 tracks and is almost 6 hours long. All profits will help fight for AIDS/ HIV and related health issues around the world through the Red Hot Organization. Day of the Dead is the follow up to 2009's Dark Was the Night (4AD), a 32-track, multi-artist compilation also produced by the Dessner brothers for Red Hot.

Day of the Dead features collaborations and recordings from a diverse group of artists including Wilco, Flaming Lips, Bruce Hornsby, Justin Vernon, the National, the War on Drugs, Lee Ranaldo of Sonic Youth, Ira Kaplan of Yo La Tengo, Jenny Lewis, Unknown Mortal Orchestra, Perfume Genius, Jim James of My Morning Jacket, Senegalese collective Orchestra Baobob, composer Terry Riley and his son Gyan Riley, electronic artist Tim Hecker, jazz pianist Vijay Iyer and Bela Fleck.

Of the 59 tracks on the compilation, many feature a house band made up of Aaron, Bryce, fellow the National bandmates and brothers Scott and Bryan Devendorf, Josh Kaufman (who co-produced the project), and Conrad Doucette along with Sam Cohen and Walter Martin. The National have a couple of tracks on the album, including "Peggy-O," "Morning Dew" and "I Know You Rider".

A Day of the Dead live performance took place in August 2016 at the second annual Eaux Claires Festival (August 12–13) featuring Jenny Lewis, Matthew Houck, Lucius, Will Oldham, Sam Amidon, Richard Reed Parry, Justin Vernon, Bruce Hornsby, Ruban Nielson and The National.

Forever Love
Forever Love is a collaboration between Aaron and Bryce Dessner, renowned Icelandic performance artist Ragnar Kjartansson and Gyða and Kristín Anna Valtýsdóttir, formerly of the Icelandic band múm. The project is a blending of visual and performance art with live music, all centered around a song cycle written and performed by Aaron and Bryce alongside Gyða and Kristín Anna Valtýsdóttir. It was commissioned by Eaux Claires Festival and made its world premiere in 2015 where it served as the official starting point of the festival on both Friday and Saturday.

Forever Love marked a live performance reunion for the Dessner twins and Kjartansson, as both artists had previously collaborated on a six-hour video work, A Lot of Sorrow, which documents the National performing their three-song "Sorrow" for six hours in front of a live audience at MoMA PS1.

The Long Count
The Long Count was a large commission for the BAM Next Wave Festival in 2009. Dessner and his brother, Bryce, worked alongside visual artist Matthew Ritchie, creating a work loosely based on the Mayan creation story Popol Vuh. The work included a 12-piece orchestra and a number of guest singers, including Kim and Kelley Deal (the Breeders, the Pixies), Matt Berninger (the National), Shara Worden (My Brightest Diamond), and Tunde Adebimpe (TV on the Radio). The work had its world premiere at the Krannert Center for the Performing Arts in September 2009 as part of the Ellnora Festival. It has since been performed at BAM, the Holland Festival and the Barbican.

Dark Was the Night

In 2009, Aaron and Bryce Dessner produced an extensive AIDS charity compilation, Dark Was the Night, for the Red Hot Organization. The record features exclusive recordings and collaborations from a long list of artists including David Byrne, the Arcade Fire, Sufjan Stevens, Feist, Sharon Jones, Cat Power, Grizzly Bear, My Morning Jacket, the Decemberists, Bon Iver, Conor Oberst, and Spoon. Dark Was the Night has raised over 2 million dollars for AIDS charities as of January 2012. In 2009, Dessner contributed a track to the Dark Was the Night compilation. This track, "Big Red Machine", was co-written with Justin Vernon of Bon Iver, and was also featured in the 2010 film, "Last Minutes with ODEN," a short documentary that later went on to win the overall Best Video Award at the first annual Vimeo Awards ceremony.

On May 3, 2009, 4AD and Red Hot produced Dark Was the Night – Live, a concert celebrating the newest Red Hot album. The show took place at Radio City Music Hall and featured several of the artists that contributed to the compilation.

Other collaborations and contributions
Dessner is a frequent collaborator with a wide range of musicians, including his brother and bandmate Bryce Dessner. In August 2008, Aaron and Bryce performed a collaborative concert with David Cossin, and Luca Tarantino as a part of Soundres, an international residency program for contemporary music and art in Salento, Italy and at the Guitare Au Palais Festival Perpignan France. They also performed at Matthew Ritchie's Ghost Operator opening at the White Cube Gallery in London. Aaron and Bryce have also collaborated with many world-renowned orchestras. Most recently the brothers played with the Copenhagen Philharmonic in a concert billed as "Sixty Minutes of the Dessners." The program included "St. Carolyn by the Sea," "Lachrimae" and "Raphael," all of which were composed by Bryce Dessner. Bryce and Aaron have also performed "St. Carolyn by the Sea" and "Raphael" with the Amsterdam Sinfonietta during the Holland Festival. These performances took place at Muziekgebouw aan 't IJ in Amsterdam and Muziekgebouw Frits Philips in Eindhoven. In October 2011, Dessner joined his brother to perform "St. Carolyn by the Sea" with the American Composers Orchestra at The World Financial Center in New York City.

Marshall Curry's award-winning documentary Racing Dreams includes music contributed by both Dessner and the National. "Win Win" directed by Thomas McCarthy closes with "Think You Can Wait," a track written by Dessner and Matt Berninger, recorded by the National with additional vocals from Sharon Van Etten. Dessner also played an important role in the National's contribution to the HBO show Game of Thrones. In May 2012 the National's performance of "Rains of Castamere" played during the closing credits of season two episode nine. Though the song is not an original, Dessner helped to interpret the instruments and music so that it evoked the land of Westeros.

In March 2012, Dessner, Scott Devendorf and Bryan Devendorf teamed up with Grateful Dead guitarist Bob Weir for a live webcast, which featured two musical sets and a political discussion. The event was produced by Head Count, a non-partisan organization that uses live music events to promote voter registration and awareness.

In December 2012, Dessner curated a day of Other Voices, an Irish music festival that aired live on RTÉ Two in Ireland. The performances took place in the Church of St James in Dingle, County Kerry. Dessner brought three bands to Other Voices: Luluc, This Is the Kit and Local Natives.

Aaron and Bryce also teamed up to write the musical soundtrack for Cyrano which was released in early 2022.

Curator

Eaux Claires Music & Arts Festival
Eaux Claires is a music festival founded and curated by Dessner and Justin Vernon. The inaugural festival took place in July 2015 in Vernon's hometown of Eau Claire, Wisconsin. Speaking about the festival, Dessner and Vernon said they were driven by the idea that this festival would "encourage music-genre-walls to melt away."

PEOPLE Festival
PEOPLE Festival is a not-for-profit gathering of artists in Berlin for a weekend-long festival of music curated and produced by Dessner along with his brother Bryce Dessner, Bon Iver, Berlin's Michelberger Hotel and others. The first festival took place October 1–2, 2016, under the name "Michelberger Music" in the Funkhaus, the historical radio recording studios of the former GDR. Prior to the festival, all the artists spent a week together in Berlin, rehearsing and working in the spaces where the shows took place. The festival featured 80 artists, including Bon Iver, Nils Frahm, Mouse on Mars' Andi Toma and Jan St. Werner, Erlend Øye, My Brightest Diamond's Shara Nova, Lisa Hannigan, Damien Rice, and many more.

Boston Calling Music Festival
Boston Calling is a music festival co-curated by Dessner. Debuting in May 2013, Boston Calling previously took place twice a year, May and September, at City Hall Plaza. Boston Calling moved to the Harvard Athletic Complex in Allston in May 2017 and transitioned to one festival per year. The festival included a film component curated by Natalie Portman. Performers of past Boston Callings have included Sia, the National, Beck, My Morning Jacket, Of Monsters and Men, Fun., Kendrick Lamar, Passion Pit, Vampire Weekend, Modest Mouse, Airborne Toxic Event, and Disclosure.

Crossing Brooklyn Ferry
Crossing Brooklyn Ferry is a music festival curated by Aaron and Bryce Dessner. The festival showcases bands, composers, singer-songwriters and filmmakers from all corners of the New York music scene. The inaugural festival took place May 3–5, 2012 at the Brooklyn Academy of Music and included performances by the Walkmen, St. Vincent, Beirut, the Antlers, yMusic and Jherek Bischoff, as well as newly commissioned films by Jonas Mekas, Joseph Gordon-Levitt and Tunde Adebimpe, among others. 2013's event took place April 25–27 at BAM and included performances by the Roots, Solange, TV on the Radio, Phosphorescent and the Brooklyn Youth Chorus. The event also featured a curated program of film shorts and a visual art installation by Andrew Ondrejcak.

Record labels
Dessner co-founded the record label 37d03d (read: PEOPLE upside down) with Justin Vernon and Bryce Dessner. They have released albums by Big Red Machine, Bonny Light Horseman, Eve Owen, Mina Tindle, and more.

Alongside Alec Hanley Bemis and Bryce Dessner, Dessner founded Brassland Records, a label that has released albums from the National, This Is the Kit, Clogs, Doveman and Nico Muhly.

Musical equipment 
Dessner often plays a 1965 Gibson Firebird purchased on eBay and refurbished. During the Sleep Well Beast recording sessions, he used the Firebird as well as a 1972 Fender Telecaster. During live shows, Dessner usually plays the Firebird and a 1963 Fender Jazzmaster.

For the Sleep Well Beast sessions, amplifiers used include a 1959 Fender Champ, a 1960s Fender Princeton, a 1970s Music Man, an Ampeg Gemini, and a Fender Bassman.

Awards and nominations

Grammy Awards

Discography

With The National 

The National (2001)
Sad Songs for Dirty Lovers (2003)
Alligator (2005)
Boxer (2007)
High Violet (2010)
Trouble Will Find Me (2013)
Sleep Well Beast (2017)
I Am Easy to Find (2019)
First Two Pages of Frankenstein (2023)

With Project Nim 
A Tower of Babel (1995)
Where the Nothings Live (1997)
Evenings Pop and Curve (1998)

With Equinox 
Equinox (1993)

With Big Red Machine 
Big Red Machine (August 31, 2018)
How Long Do You Think It's Gonna Last? (August 27, 2021)

With Complete Mountain Almanac 
Complete Mountain Almanac (January 27, 2023)

Film scores 
Big Sur (2013) with Bryce Dessner
Transpecos (2016) with Bryce Dessner
C'mon, C'mon (2021) with Bryce Dessner

Stage musicals 

 Cyrano (2018) with Matt Berninger, Carin Besser, Bryce Dessner, and Erica Schmidt

Personal life
Dessner grew up in Cincinnati, Ohio with his twin brother, Bryce Dessner. He graduated from Cincinnati Country Day School in Cincinnati, Ohio in 1994 and from Columbia College at Columbia University in 1998. He and his wife have three children. Dessner is a keen soccer fan and an avid supporter of Liverpool F.C.

References

External links
Official website of the National
Official website of Dark Was the Night
Interview with Aquarium Drunkard
Interview with Pitchfork the National and production projects

Living people
American rock guitarists
American male guitarists
American indie rock musicians
20th-century American Jews
Grammy Award winners
Jewish American songwriters
American people of Polish-Jewish descent
American people of Russian-Jewish descent
1976 births
The National (band) members
Twin musicians
Guitarists from New York City
Big Red Machine (band) members
21st-century American Jews